Siento is the twenty-third (23rd) studio album by Puerto Rican singer Yolandita Monge. It was released in 1999 with her new recording contract with BMG U.S. Latin.  With this album the singer returned to her usual strong melodramatic ballads along with producer Ricardo Eddy Martínez from Vivencias. It includes the radio hit "Dime", as well as the dance single "Mala Sangre". The sales exceeded 50.000 copies, earning Gold status, and it is currently out of print in all formats. This album is her only studio album for BMG U.S. Latin and is still unavailable as a digital download.

Track listing

Credits and personnel

Vocals: Yolandita Monge
Producer: Ricardo Eddy Martínez
Arrangements, Programming & Keyboards: Ricardo Eddy Martínez
Guitars: René Luis Toledo
Sax Tenor: Ed Calle
Chorus: Rita Quintero, Wendy Pedersen, Tommy Anthony
Strings: Miami Symphonic Strings by Alfredo Oliva
Violins: Alfredo Oliva, Mei Mei Luo, Scott Flavin, Orlando Forté, Robert Rozek, Joane Faigen, Gennady Aronin, Huifang Chen, Laszlo Pap, Gustavo Correa, John DiPuccio, Rafael Elvira
Violas: Tim Barnes, Richard, Flieschman, Debra Spring, Yang Xi
Cellos: Claudio Jaffe, Chris Glansdorp

Recording Engineers: Mike Couzzi, Víctor Di Persia
Assistants: Juan González
Mixing: Mike Couzzi
Recorded: Ocean Vu, Miami; Fullersound, Miami 
Mastering & Editing: Master Media Studio
Engineers: Frank Cesarano
Photography: Fernando Báez
Hair & Make-Up: Fernando Báez
Cover Design: Arte Gráfico Y...

Notes

Track listing and credits from album booklet.
Released in Cassette Format on 1999 (74321-66977-4).

Charts

Album

Singles

References

Yolandita Monge albums
1990 albums